Oldham is a surname meaning "'old lands" with origins tracing to the town of Oldham, in Greater Manchester, England.

People named Oldham include:

Andrew Loog Oldham (born 1944), British rock group manager
Arthur Oldham (1926–2003), English chorusmaster, composer
Chris Oldham (born 1968), American football player
Denver Oldham (born 1936), American pianist 
Derek Oldham (1887–1968), English singer and actor
George Oldham (disambiguation), multiple people
Greg Oldham (born 1947), American economist
Henry Yule Oldham, (1862–1951), British geographer
Hugh Oldham (1450–1519), English bishop
Jawann Oldham (born 1957), American basketball player
John Oldham (disambiguation), multiple people
Joseph Houldsworth Oldham (1874–1969), Scottish missionary
Megan Oldham (born 2001), Canadian freestyle skier
Ray Oldham (1951–2005), American football player
Red Oldham (1893–1961), American baseball player
Richard Oldham (disambiguation), multiple people
Scott Oldham (born 1969), American journalist
Spooner Oldham (born 1943), American musician
Stephen Oldham (born 1948), English cricketer 
Thomas Oldham (1816–1878), British geologist
Todd Oldham (born 1961), American fashion designer
William Oldham (disambiguation), multiple people

See also
 Oldham, a large town in Greater Manchester
 List of Old English (Anglo-Saxon) surnames
 Oldham (disambiguation)

References

English toponymic surnames